Saunders Bluff is a small, isolated bluff standing 9 nautical miles (17 km) east-southeast of Miller Butte in the Outback Nunataks. Mapped by United States Geological Survey (USGS) from surveys and U.S. Navy air photos, 1959–64. Named by Advisory Committee on Antarctic Names (US-ACAN) for Jeffrey J. Saunders, biolab technician at McMurdo Station, 1965–66.

Cliffs of Victoria Land
Pennell Coast